= Rectors of the University of Warsaw =

Rectors of the University of Warsaw – List of rectors of the University of Warsaw, known also as the Royal University of Warsaw, Imperial University of Warsaw, Józef Piłsudski University of Warsaw. The list begins in 1816 at the creation of the university.

== Royal University of Warsaw ==
- Wojciech Szweykowski (1818–1831)
- Józef Karol Skrodzki (1831)

== Szkoła Głowna Warszwska ==
- Józef Mianowski (1862–1869)

== Imperial University of Warsaw ==
- Piotr Ławrowski (1869–1873)
- Nikołaj Błagowieszczański (1874–1884)
- Nikołaj Ławrowski (1884–1890)
- Michaił Szałfiejew (1895)
- Pawieł Kowalewski (1896)
- Grigorij Zenger (1896)
- Michaił Szałfiejew (1898)
- Grigorij Uljanow (1899–1903)
- Piotr Ziłow (1904)
- Jefim Karski (1905–1911)
- Wasilij Kudrewiecki (1911–1912)
- Iwan Triepicyn (1913)
- Siergiej Wiechow (1914–1915)
- Józef Brudziński (1915–1917)
- Antoni Kostanecki (1917–1919)

== University of Warsaw ==
- Stanisław Józef Thugutt (1919–1920)
- Jan Karol Kochanowski (1920–1921)
- Jan Mazurkiewicz (1921–1922)
- Jan Łukasiewicz (1922–1923)
- Ignacy Koschembahr-Łyskowski (1923–1924)
- Franciszek Krzyształowicz (1924–1925)
- Stefan Pieńkowski (1925–1926)
- Bolesław Hryniewiecki (1926–1927)
- Antoni Szlagowski (1927–1928)
- Gustaw Przychocki (1928–1929)
- Tadeusz Brzeski (1929–1930)
- Mieczysław Michałowicz (1930–1931)
- Jan Łukasiewicz (1931–1932)
- Józef Ujejski (1932–1933)
- Stefan Pieńkowski (1933–1935)

== Józef Piłsudski University of Warsaw ==
- Stefan Pieńkowski (1935-1936)
- Włodzimierz Antoniewicz (1936–1939)
- Jerzy Modrakowski (1939)

== University of Warsaw ==
- Stefan Pieńkowski (1945–1947)
- Franciszek Czubalski (1947–1949)
- Jan Wasilkowski (1949–1952)
- Stanisław Turski (1952–1969)
- Zygmunt Rybicki (1969–1980)
- Henryk Samsonowicz (1980–1982)
- Kazimierz Albin Dobrowolski (1982–1985)
- Rector electus Klemens Szaniawski (1984)
- Grzegorz Białkowski (1985–1989)
- Andrzej Kajetan Wróblewski (1989–1993)
- Włodzimierz Siwiński (1993–1999)
- Piotr Węgleński (1999–2005)
- Katarzyna Chałasińska-Macukow (2005–2012)
- Marcin Pałys (2012–2020)
- Alojzy Nowak (since 2020)
